James Robertson Zavitz (28 July 1922 – 16 May 2017) was a Canadian sport shooter who competed in the 1956 Summer Olympics.

References

1922 births
2017 deaths
Canadian male sport shooters
Olympic shooters of Canada
Shooters at the 1956 Summer Olympics
Pan American Games medalists in shooting
Pan American Games bronze medalists for Canada
Shooters at the 1959 Pan American Games
20th-century Canadian people